Out of the Grey is the self-titled debut album by Out of the Grey, released in 1991. It was ranked 47th in the book CCM Presents: The 100 Greatest Albums in Christian Music.

Track listing 
All songs written by Christine and Scott Denté, except where noted.

 "Wishes" (Christine Denté, Scott Denté, Charlie Peacock) – 4:58
 "Write My Life" (Christine Denté, Scott Denté, Charlie Peacock) – 4:11
 "Remember This" (Christine Denté, Scott Denté, Charlie Peacock) – 4:31
 "The Dance" (Christine Denté, Scott Denté, Charlie Peacock) – 3:36
 "He Is Not Silent" – 4:00
 "Better Way to Fall" – 4:31
 "Time Will Tell" (Christine Denté, Scott Denté, Charlie Peacock) – 3:21
 "Perfect Circle" – 5:00
 "The Only Moment" (Christine Denté, Scott Denté, Charlie Peacock) – 3:15
 "The Deep" – 3:21

Personnel 

 Christine Denté – vocals
 Scott Denté – vocals, acoustic guitar, electric guitars 
 Jerry McPherson – electric guitars 
 Charlie Peacock – keyboards, acoustic piano, programming, arrangements 
 Craig Hansen – additional programming
 Blair Masters – sampling 
 Tommy Sims – bass 
 Steve Grossman – drums
 Chris McHugh – drums 
 Eric Darken – percussion 
 Rick Will – tambourine 
 Vince Ebo – backing vocals 
 Vicki Hampton – backing vocals

Production

 Charlie Peacock – producer
 Peter York – executive producer
 Craig Hansen – engineer, mixing (8, 10)
 Jonathan Beach – assistant engineer
 Buzz Leffler – assistant engineer
 Garrett Rockey – assistant engineer
 Kevin Twit – additional engineer
 Rick Will – mixing (1, 2, 4)
 Bill Deaton – mixing (3, 5, 6, 7, 9)
 Graham Lewis – mix assistant (3, 5, 6, 7, 9)
 Ken Love – mastering at MasterMix, Nashville, Tennessee
 Heather Horne – art direction, design
 Chris Carroll – photography
 Kaleidoscope Sound, Bellevue, Tennessee – recording location, mixing location
 Digital Recorders – mixing location
 Sixteenth Avenue Sound, Nashville, Tennessee – mixing location

References

Out of the Grey albums
1991 albums